The 1992 Lehigh Engineers football team was an American football team that represented Lehigh University during the 1992 NCAA Division I-AA football season. Lehigh tied for third place in the Patriot League. 

In their seventh year under head coach Hank Small, the Engineers compiled a 3–8 record. Adam Ciperski and Jason Cristino were the team captains.

The Engineers were outscored 291 to 258. Their 2–3 conference record tied for third place in the six-team Patriot League standings. 

Lehigh played its home games at Goodman Stadium on the university's Goodman Campus in Bethlehem, Pennsylvania.

Schedule

References

Lehigh
Lehigh Mountain Hawks football seasons
Lehigh Engineers football